Dabchick may refer to:

The little grebe (Tachybaptus ruficollis), also known as dabchick
The New Zealand dabchick or weweia (Poliocephalus rufopectus)
The Dabchick sailing dinghy
People from Aldbourne, England